Umhlanga may refer to:
Umhlanga, KwaZulu-Natal, a town north of Durban
Umhlanga Lagoon Nature Reserve on the shore of the Indian Ocean at Umhlanga Rocks, South Africa
Umhlanga River, a river in KwaZulu-Natal
Umhlanga (ceremony) or Reed Dance in Eswatini